Polysaccus is a genus of barnacles belonging to the monotypic family Polysaccidae.

Species:

Polysaccus japonicus 
Polysaccus mediterraneus

References

Barnacles
Maxillopoda genera